The 2022 Betfred Women's World Matchplay was the inaugural staging of the tournament by the Professional Darts Corporation. The tournament featured the top eight players on the 2022 PDC Women's Series Order of Merit, competing in a knockout format, with the winner earning a place in the 2022 Grand Slam of Darts. The tournament was held at the Winter Gardens in Blackpool on 24 July 2022.

Fallon Sherrock won the title, defeating Aileen de Graaf 6–3 in the final.

Format
The format was confirmed on 30 June 2022, with the tournament using a leg format. The quarter-finals are the best of 7 legs (or first to 4 legs), the semi-finals are the best of 9 legs (or first to 5 legs), and the final is the best of 11 legs (or first to 6 legs). Unlike the men's edition the matches didn't have to be won by two clear legs.

Prize money
The total prize fund was £25,000. The winner of the tournament also got a spot in the 2022 Grand Slam of Darts. It was then later confirmed that the winner of this, and all future Women's World Matchplay tournaments will qualify for the PDC World Darts Championship.

Qualifiers
The eight qualifiers for the tournament were the top 8 ranked players on the 2022 PDC Women's Series Order of Merit after the first 12 events.

The qualifiers were:

Draw

References

World Matchplay (darts)
Women's World Matchplay
Women's World Matchplay
Women's World Matchplay